Henry Skaggs (January 8, 1724 – December 4, 1810. Occasional alternative spellings: "Skeggs" and "Scaggs") was an American longhunter, explorer and pioneer, active primarily on the frontiers of Tennessee and Kentucky during the latter half of the 18th century.  His career as an explorer began as early as 1761 as one of the so-called long hunters— men who undertook lengthy hunting expeditions into the Trans-Allegheny wilderness.  In subsequent years, working as a land agent with Richard Henderson and Daniel Boone, he explored large parts of Middle Tennessee and Central Kentucky.  Skaggs led a pursuit and failed attempt to apprehend America's first known serial killers, the Harpe Brothers in 1799.

Early life
Henry Skaggs was born on January 8, 1724, in the Province of Maryland, British Royal Colony, British North America, British Empire to James Skaggs, a Scots-Irish immigrant, and his wife Rachel.   James Skaggs and his sons, were noted hunters and fur traders.

Longhunter
In 1761, Henry Skaggs joined an expedition, led by Elisha Walden, into Carter's Valley in present-day Hawkins County, Tennessee.  This was followed by a 1763 trip deeper into Cumberland territory.
 
In 1764, Henry Skaggs led his first expedition through the Cumberland Gap, a mountain pass at the junction of Kentucky, Tennessee and Virginia.  These early trips westward attracted the interest of famed explorer Daniel Boone.  Boone used his existing relationship with North Carolina land speculator Richard Henderson to recruit Skaggs as an agent for Henderson's land company, Richard Henderson and Company.  In 1765, Skaggs explored the lower Cumberland River region (upper Middle Tennessee) as an agent of Henderson and established his station near the present day Goodlettsville, Tennessee.

In the Fall of 1769, Henry Skaggs returned to the Cumberland with Kasper Mansker, Joseph Drake and Colonel James Knox.  This expedition reached the Dix River in Kentucky, and pressed on to the Green River country.  One day on this expedition, the group heard an eerie sound unlike anything they had ever heard before.  Mansker pressed forward to investigate only to find the source of the mysterious noise to be Daniel Boone, sprawled on a deerskin, singing.  The Boones, Daniel and Squire, stayed with the expedition for a week or two, harvesting wild meat and rendering tallow.

Part of the Wilderness Road, crossing Rockcastle County, Kentucky from Hazel Patch to Crab Orchard, was known as "Skaggs Trace," named after Henry Skaggs.

In June 1775, Skaggs, along with Valentine Harman, a member of the Transylvania Convention at Boonesborough in May, led Colonel Thomas Slaughter to the Green River country of Kentucky to explore that land on behalf of Richard Henderson's Transylvania Company, which had recently purchased the area along with a large portion of Central Kentucky.

In pursuit of serial killers, The Harpes
In 1799, Skaggs led the frontier pursuit of the notorious serial killers, the Harpe Brothers, in Western Kentucky.  Several vigilante posses were formed to look for the escaped criminals, but the only one that found them became frightened and ran.  Skaggs, enraged, tried to reform the scattered party and pursue the Harpes, but to no avail.  Undeterred, he pressed on alone, and an hour later encountered a crowd of some 20-30 settlers, jigging and drinking in the cabin of some newcomers at the close of a house-raising celebration.  Skaggs told them his dire news.  The men, already quite drunk, grabbed bottles and rifles indiscriminately and joined the hunt for the Harpes.  Once in the forest, however, the posse's enthusiasm evaporated.  Once again, Skaggs saw his followers disappear, and continued on alone.

Skaggs came to the cabin of a pioneer named Colonel Daniel Trabue, an old Indian fighter.  Trabue agreed to join the hunt for the Harpes as soon as his son returned from an errand to borrow some flour and beans from a neighbor.  Unfortunately for Trabue, the famished Harpes found his son first. The son's blood-soaked dog returned to the cabin and led Trabue and Skaggs to the sinkhole where the Harpes had discarded the body.  He had been brutally beaten and tomahawked, and his load of supplies was stolen.  Skaggs and Trabue searched for days, but never found the Harpes.

Death
Henry Skaggs may have initially settled, before 1792, in the vicinity of Big or Little Pittman’s Creek, both tributaries of Green River, in present-day northeast Green County, Kentucky.  However, land claims in the military district of Kentucky south of Green River were restricted to grants for veterans of the Revolutionary War until 1796.  After Barren County, Kentucky, was organized (1798) from parts of Warren County and Green County, Henry Skaggs filed a claim in July, 1801, in Barren County Court for 200 acres of land. The original survey and deed have not been examined, but this tract was evidently located at or near present-day Hiseville, in Barren County, where he probably lived until he died.  

Henry Skaggs died of natural causes, on December 4, 1810, and was buried in Henry Skaggs Cemetery, in the community of present-day Hiseville and Park, in Barren County, only a few miles from where he had reputedly camped near Glasgow while first exploring the Green River country in 1770-71 (cf. Kentucky Highway Historical Marker No. 635).

DNA Testing 
Extensive Y-DNA testing has been done on the family of Henry Skaggs with four descendants of two of his brothers, James & Jacob, testing positive for subclade R-BY44771.

References

External links
 Genealogy & History Notes
 Prestonsburg, Kentucky: Jenny Wiley Festival
 The Saga of Jenny Wiley
 The Jenny Wiley Story
 Skaggs Trace Historical Marker
  America's First Serial Killers
  The Tragedy at Frenchman's Knob

1724 births
1810 deaths
American explorers
American hunters
American surveyors
Kentucky pioneers
Burials in Kentucky
People of colonial Maryland
People from Barren County, Kentucky